The Baeksang Arts Award for Best New Actor – Television is an award presented annually at the Baeksang Arts Awards ceremony organised by Ilgan Sports and JTBC Plus, affiliates of JoongAng Ilbo, usually in the second quarter of each year in Seoul.

List of winners

References

Sources

External links 
  

Baeksang Arts Awards (television)
Television acting awards